The 2003 League of Ireland First Division season was the 19th season of the League of Ireland First Division and the first to be played as a summer league.

Overview
The First Division was contested by 12 teams and Dublin City won the division. Each team played the other teams three times, totaling 33 games.

Final table

Promotion/relegation play-off
Four teams entered the promotion/relegation play-off. The second, third and fourth placed teams from the First Division were joined by the ninth placed team from the 2003 League of Ireland Premier Division.

Semi-final
1st Legs

2nd Legs

Derry City win 4–0 on aggregate

Finn Harps win 3–1 on aggregate

Final

Derry City win 2–1 on aggregate and retain their place in the Premier Division.

See also
 2003 League of Ireland Premier Division

References

League of Ireland First Division seasons
2
Ireland
Ireland
2